The Good Karma Hospital is a medical drama series produced by Tiger Aspect Productions for ITV about a disillusioned doctor, Ruby Walker, who travels to South India hoping to make a fresh start. It stars Amanda Redman, Amrita Acharia, James Krishna Floyd, and Neil Morrissey. The series is shot in Unawatuna in southern Sri Lanka, Thiranagama Golden Beach Restaurant and some other places in Galle District.

The Good Karma Hospital was recommissioned for a second and a third series. Filming for the second series started in August 2017 and it was broadcast from 18 March 2018. Series 3 first aired in October 2019 in Australia, with a UK premiere in March 2020. A fourth series started airing in the UK on 23 January 2022. In November 2022 it was announced that the show has been cancelled after its fourth series.

Plot
A medical drama about a junior doctor, Ruby Walker, who becomes disillusioned with her life and broken relationship, and decides to leave the UK. Seeing an advertisement for a hospital job in south India, she travels there hoping to make a fresh start and finds herself working at The Good Karma Hospital, an under-resourced and overworked cottage hospital run by an eccentric English expat, Dr. Lydia Fonseca.

Cast and characters
 Amanda Redman as Dr Lydia Fonseca
 Amrita Acharia as Dr Ruby Walker
 James Floyd as Dr Gabriel Varma
 Neil Morrissey as Greg McConnell
 Darshan Jariwala as Dr Ram Nair
 Sagar Radia as AJ Nair (Series 1–3)
 Nimmi Harasgama as Mari Rodriguez
 Phillip Jackson as Paul Smart (Series 1–2, 4)
 Phyllis Logan as Maggie Smart (Series 1, cameo Series 2) 
 Priyanka Bose as Dr Aisha Ray (Series 3)
 Scarlett Alice Johnson as Tommy McConnell (Series 3) 
 Kenneth Cranham as Ted Dalrymple (Series 3)
 Rebecca Ablack as Dr Nikita 'Niki' Sharma (Series 4)
 Harki Bhambra as Dr Samir Hasan (Series 4)
 Raquel Cassidy as Frankie Martin (Series 4)
 Ritvik Sahore as Atul Nadar (Series 1)

Episodes
<onlyinclude>

Series 1 (2017)

Series 2 (2018)

Series 3 (2019)

Series 4 (2022)

Reception
On Rotten Tomatoes season 1 received an 80% rating based on reviews from 5 critics.

Gayle Pennington of the St. Louis Post Dispatch described the first season as “a magical combination of familiar and exotically foreign…. a drama you’ll remember long after you finish watching it.“

Writing for the Indian digital news publication Scroll, Vikram Johri  says: ”The series…has its heart in the right place even if it cannot entirely avoid tone-deaf generalisations…  Ignore these irritants and the show can be engaging, especially when it is not trying to train the viewer in Indian mores…   It is Walker who is the show’s beating heart. Unaware of Indian customs and rituals,..she takes to her new home and assignment with gusto, quickly imbibing that all-important Indian lesson of making do with what’s available. As a paediatrician, she finds herself performing minor surgical procedures. However, it is her deep reserves of empathy – and the gentle eyes of the actress who plays her – that make her the ideal doctor. “

Deborah Ross for Event Magazine says that the series, “…does not have an original bone in its body…. It’s intended as Sunday night ‘unchallenging’ fare but if you can sit through it without feeling so challenged you want to throw a shoe at the TV, you are made of stronger stuff than I. “

DVD releases

References

External links
 
 

2017 British television series debuts
2022 British television series endings
2010s British drama television series
2010s British medical television series
2020s British drama television series
2020s British medical television series
English-language television shows
ITV television dramas
Television series by Banijay
Television series by Tiger Aspect Productions
Television shows set in India